Ras Sedr massacre (in Hebrew: טבח ראס סודר) was a mass murder of dozens of Egyptian prisoners of war that took place immediately after a paratrooper unit of the Israel Defense Forces conquered Ras Sedr (also known as Ras Sudr) on 8 June 1967 during the Six-Day War.

Events
In June 2000, Egypt's Al-Wafd newspaper reported that a mass grave was discovered in Ras Sedr, containing remains of 52 prisoners killed by Israeli paratroopers during the war, who had killed the surrendered unit. The report said that some skulls had bullet holes in them, indicating execution. Initial reports in Israeli newspaper Haaretz were censored.

In April 2009, Haaretz reported that Israeli television director Ram Loevy had heard about the massacre shortly after the war, from fellow paratroopers in his unit. After testifying in Metzah, he was removed from the unit. Another claim detailed two cases of killings at the location, which happened in 1956 and 1967, respectively. A report has detailed confessions of Israeli officers who witnessed the act and this included an admission that the Red Sedr massacre was one of the three collective massacres perpetrated under the direction of Brigadier-General in reserve, Arieh Biroh (also Arye Biro), during the 1956 War and the Six-Day War of 1967. The other two included the killings at the quarry near the Mitla Pass in Sinai and the killing of escaping Egyptian officers by the 890 regiment at Sharm El-Sheikh. 

After his retirement, Biroh admitted to killing 49 Egyptian prisoners of war in the Sinai in interviews.

Legacy
It has been suggested that the massacre may have fed into the later killing of dozens of Israeli prisoners by Egyptian forces in the 1973 Yom Kippur War.

References

Massacres in Egypt
Six-Day War
Prisoner of war massacres
South Sinai Governorate
Censorship in Israel
1967 in Egypt
Massacres in 1967
June 1967 events in Asia
Massacres committed by Israel